Peta Hughes (born 29 March 1987) is a former Australian female squash player. 

She made her international debut in 2002 and retired from international squash in 2010.After the retirement from playing squash, she was crowned as the Rockhampton's Miss Showgirl in 2010.

References 

1987 births
Living people
Australian female squash players
People from Nambour, Queensland
21st-century Australian women